Greg C. Garland is an American businessman in oil and natural gas and chemicals industries, the executive chairman (and former CEO) of Phillips 66.

Early life
Greg Garland received a bachelor's degree in chemical engineering from Texas A&M University in 1980.

Career
Garland joined Phillips Petroleum Company in 1980, first as an engineer for the plastics technical center, later became a sales engineer for plastics resins, then manager for advanced materials, business development director and olefins manager for chemicals.

From 1992 to 1994, he managed the K-Resin business unit at Chevron Phillips Chemical Company. From 1995 to 1997 he was general manager of Natural Gas Liquids and since 1997 a general manager of Qatar and Middle East. From July 2000 to October 2001 he was senior vice president of planning and strategic transactions, and from October 2001 to April 2008 senior vice president of planning and specialty products/chemicals. From April 2008 to February 2011 he was CEO of Chevron Phillips Chemical.

From October 2010 to April 2012 he was the senior vice president of exploration and production for Americas at ConocoPhillips. From April 30, 2012 to June 2014 he was the president and since April 2012, chairman and CEO of Phillips 66 and its subsidiaries the Phillips 66ers Phillips 66 Pipeline LLC, Phillips 66 Partners GP LLC and Phillips 66 Partners LP. Since 2013, he has been director of Amgen Inc.

Political appointments
He sits on the board of the American Petroleum Institute, the board for National Petroleum Council, the Greater Houston Partnership, the Engineering Advisory Board for Texas A&M University. He is a director of DCP Midstream Partners, LLC, a director of the American Chemistry Council Inc and vice president at the trade association of the American Fuel and Petrochemical Manufacturers.

Personal life
Garland is married, with four children.

References

Living people
American chief executives of energy companies
American chief executives of Fortune 500 companies
American chemical industry businesspeople
American businesspeople in the oil industry
Year of birth missing (living people)